Sádočné is a village and municipality in Považská Bystrica District in the Trenčín Region of north-western Slovakia.

History
In historical records the village was first mentioned in 1339.

Geography
The municipality lies at an altitude of 420 metres and covers an area of 7.505 km². It has a population of about 161 people.

External links
 
http://www.statistics.sk/mosmis/eng/run.html

Villages and municipalities in Považská Bystrica District